R. S. Rathnakar (born 29 October 1975) is an Indian politician and social reformer who has been seriously involved in social movements since child hood. He finished his M.B.B.S. Degree from Andhra Medical College, Visakhapatnam in 1996.

Dr.R.S.Rathnakar was born in middle-class family in Bhogapuram village, Pithapuram mandalam, East Godavari District, Andhra Pradesh on 29 October 1975. He is the last of the three children of (two elder brothers) Suvarna Raju and Ramola Bhai. His father was a school teacher and mother was house wife.

Early life and education 
Rathnakar spent his early life up to 9th class in Gollaprolu Government high school. He was educated at A.P.Residential junior college, Bhadrachalam and Government junior college, Mamidikudhuru. He spent most of his time in Visakhapatnam during MBBS studies where he met Kanshi Ram and volunteered so many social activities and participated in number of movements.

Personal life 
In 1990 Dr.R.S.Rathnakar married Rony a keralite from Kottayam District, Kerala state. The couple has two children. Dr.R.S.Rathnakar is very active in political activities and has been seriously trying to form an independent political party with the concept of "SARVAJANA SAMAJ".

External links 
 http://www.deccanchronicle.com/print/140715/nation-current-affairs/article/high-court-notices-centre-andhra-pradesh
 https://www.youtube.com/watch?v=jhBnPK7-H_w
 http://malamahanaduindia.blogspot.in/2015/05/dr-r-s-ratnakar-national-president-mala.html
 http://www.deccanchronicle.com/print/140715/nation-current-affairs/article/high-court-notices-centre-andhra-pradesh
 http://video.indiaeveryday.in/p/mala-mahanadu-national-president-dr-rs-ratnakar-attends-samaikya-vedika-in-east-godavari-cvr-news/jhBnPK7-H_w.htm
 http://www.uniindia.com/andhra-police-arrests-dalit-leader-rathnakar-in-cheating-case/south/news/1791332.html

 Studio N TV channel : Discussion with RPI AP President RS Ratnakar
 Studio N TV Channel : Discussion with RPI AP President RS Ratnakar
 Studio N TV Channel : RPI President Ratnakar Discussion on Caste System 

Andhra Pradesh local politicians
1975 births
Living people
People from East Godavari district